Reeb may refer to:

People 
 David Reeb (born 1952), Israeli artist
 Georges Reeb (1920–1993), French mathematician
 James Reeb (1927–1965) American civil rights activist
 Jörg Reeb (born 1972), German footballer
 Larry Reeb, American stand-up comedian
 Troy Reeb (born 1969), Canadian journalist

Products 
 Reeb (beer)

Mathematics 
 Reeb foliation
 Reeb graph
 Reeb sphere theorem
 Reeb stability theorem
 Reeb vector field